Friends Like These is a British game show that was broadcast on BBC One first as a pilot on 6 November 1999 and then as a full series from 12 February 2000 until 20 September 2003. It was presented by Ant & Dec from 1999 to 2001 and later by Ian Wright until 2003.

Format 
Two five-member teams, one composed of males and the other of females, competed on each episode. They played five head-to-head challenges, with both teams nominating a different member for each of the first four based on clues given by Ant & Dec. The winner of each challenge scored one point for their team. The last remaining member of each team played the fifth challenge, "The Decider", in which each team could score up to five points.

The higher-scoring team at the end of the decider advanced to the question round, in which each member could win a holiday. All five sat in a row, with their chairs initially lit up white. One member at a time chose a teammate, who randomly drew one of 10 questions that the member had answered on a questionnaire before the show. The teammate then tried to guess the answer given by the member. If they were correct, the member's chair remained white; if not, it turned red.

After all five members had a chance to play, the ones in the white chairs were offered a choice. They could end the game immediately, each winning the holiday while the others won nothing, or gamble their prize in the hope of winning it for everyone. If they chose to gamble, the members in the red chairs chose one "white" and drew a question to answer about them. A correct response awarded the holiday to all five team members, while a miss sent them all home empty-handed.

Transmissions

Series

Specials

References

External links 
 
 .
 Friends Like These at BFI.
 .

Ant & Dec
1990s British game shows
2000s British game shows
1999 British television series debuts
2003 British television series endings
BBC television game shows